Amany Ali is an Egyptian Paralympic powerlifter. She represented Egypt at the 2012 Summer Paralympics and at the 2016 Summer Paralympics and she won the bronze medal in the women's 73 kg event in 2016.

At the 2014 World Championships she won the silver medal in the women's 73 kg event. She also competed at the 2019 World Championships where she finished in 5th place in the women's 86 kg event.

At the 2015 African Games she won the bronze medal in the women's 67 & 73 kg event.

At the 2018 World Para Powerlifting African Championships she won the silver medal in the women's 86 kg event.

References

External links 
 

Living people
Year of birth missing (living people)
Place of birth missing (living people)
Egyptian powerlifters
Powerlifters at the 2012 Summer Paralympics
Powerlifters at the 2016 Summer Paralympics
Powerlifters at the 2020 Summer Paralympics
Medalists at the 2016 Summer Paralympics
Paralympic bronze medalists for Egypt
Paralympic medalists in powerlifting
Paralympic powerlifters of Egypt
Competitors at the 2015 African Games
African Games competitors for Egypt
21st-century Egyptian women